Elections to the French National Assembly were held in Ivory Coast on 17 June 1951 as part of the wider parliamentary elections. The African Democratic Rally (Félix Houphouët-Boigny) and French Union (Sékou Sanogo) each won a single seat.

Results

References

Ivory
1951 in Ivory Coast
Elections in Ivory Coast
Ivory Coast
1951, Ivory Coast